Dean Markley Strings is an American company that manufactures musical instrument-related products, primarily strings for acoustic and electric guitars, classical guitars, and bass guitars. The company also produces pick ups, amplifiers, and tuners, with instrument strings being their feature product.

History
Before starting the company, Dean Markley was a music store owner in Santa Clara, California. In 1972 he began selling string designs he came up with himself through experimentation. His first breakthrough into success was when he created the Voice Box effects pedal used by Peter Frampton in his smash hit "Show Me the Way".

Blue Steel guitar strings
One of Dean Markley's recent notable innovations are "Blue Steel" guitar and bass strings, which are cryogenically frozen with liquid nitrogen to make them last longer.

References

External links
 Dean Markley Interview for NAMM Oral History Program (2007)

Musical instrument manufacturing companies of the United States
Companies based in Arizona